Yangylbay (Yañılbay) is a rural locality (a selo) in Muzhukaysky Selsoviet, Babayurtovsky District, Republic of Dagestan, Russia. The population was 153 as of 2010. There are 2 streets.

Geography 
Yangylbay is located 15 km northeast of Babayurt (the district's administrative centre) by road. Muzhukay is the nearest rural locality.

References 

Rural localities in Babayurtovsky District